Grand Valley Transit is the public transportation agency that serves the Grand Junction area. Fixed route service began in 2000. Eleven routes run hourly on Monday through Saturday, with seven of them meeting in a downtown transit center.

Route list 
1 Airport
2 Patterson Rd
3 Orchard Ave
4 Palisade
5 Midtown
6 Orchard Mesa
7 College Connector
8 Fruita
9 North Ave
10 Clifton
11 Shopping Malls

References

External links 
 Official website

Transportation in Mesa County, Colorado
Bus transportation in Colorado
Transit agencies in Colorado